Dāshkasan (also Romanized as Dāshkesan or Dāshgesan; is a village in Gorji Rural District, in the Central District of Buin va Miandasht County, Isfahan Province, Iran. At the 2006 census, its population was 606, in 125 families.

Dāshkasan is situated in the Zagros mountain range. It has a population of ethnic Georgians (ფერეიდნელი). People from Dāshkasan speak a Georgian dialect, along with Persian. The Georgian alphabet is also used.

See also 

Georgians in Iran

References
Notes

Bibliography
Muliani, S. (2001) Jaygah-e Gorjiha dar Tarikh va Farhang va Tamaddon-e Iran. Esfahan: Yekta [The Georgians’ position in the Iranian history and civilization].

Populated places in Buin va Miandasht County